The Fort Schuyler Club, founded in 1883, is a traditional gentlemen's club located in downtown Utica, New York, USA. Early members of the club included Elihu Root, Francis Kernan, Horatio Seymour, Charlemagne Tower, and Ward Hunt.

The club's clubhouse is "significant as a rare and substantially intact example of a late 19th-early 20th century social club" in downtown utica. The building, built in stages from 1830 on, is a landmark located prominently on Genesee Street, the "principal thoroughfare" of Utica. First used as a residence, the club purchased the building in 1883, shortly after its establishment. It was listed on the U.S. National Register of Historic Places in 2004.

See also
List of traditional gentlemen's clubs in the United States

References

External links
Fort Schuyler Club (official site)

Clubhouses on the National Register of Historic Places in New York (state)
Cultural infrastructure completed in 1830
Buildings and structures in Utica, New York
Gentlemen's clubs in New York (state)
1830 establishments in New York (state)
National Register of Historic Places in Oneida County, New York